Jakub Czerwiński (born 6 August 1991) is a Polish professional footballer who plays as a centre-back for Piast Gliwice.

Career statistics

Club

Honours

Club
Legia Warsaw
Ekstraklasa: 2016–17, 2017–18
Polish Cup: 2017–18

Piast Gliwice
Ekstraklasa: 2018–19

References

External links
 
 
 Jakub Czerwiński at Footballdatabase

Living people
1991 births
Association football defenders
Poland youth international footballers
Polish footballers
Bruk-Bet Termalica Nieciecza players
Pogoń Szczecin players
Legia Warsaw players
Piast Gliwice players
Ekstraklasa players
I liga players
II liga players
III liga players
People from Krynica-Zdrój